Wayfinder Family Services (WFS), Founded in 1953 as the Foundation for the Junior Blind and previously known as Junior Blind, is a United States-based nonprofit organization for services for the blind. The organization's mission is to help children and adults who are blind, visually impaired or multi-disabled achieve independence. Located in Los Angeles, WFS offers individualized methods of early intervention, education, recreation and rehabilitation to nearly 10,000 children and family members throughout California.

President and CEO, Miki Jordan, joined the organization in 2006 as the third CEO.  In January 2010, long-time supporter Stevie Wonder joined Junior Blind's Board of Directors after many years of generous donations and special appearances at Junior Blind's annual Children's Holiday Carnival.

Programs and services 
Although WFS's programs serve individuals across all stages of life, more than 98% of the people the organization serves are children and youth.  Since the "face" of blindness has changed, a large number of the children WFS serves have multiple disabilities, including autism, cerebral palsy, developmental delay and intellectual disability, in addition to visual impairment.

WFS's children's services are provided in the home, on-campus and throughout the community. Meeting the varying needs of children with special needs from birth to age 21, WFS offers an Infant & Early Childhood Program, a Special Education School, a Children's Residential Program, a Vision Screening Program and an After School Enrichment Program.

The organization is also committed to helping youth, adults and Veterans who are blind or visually impaired prepare for a life of independence and success. Providing educational, vocational and independent living instruction through the Student Transition & Enrichment Program and its mobile counterpart, Davidson Program for Independence, Blind Veterans Training Program and Advanced Assistive Technology Training, Junior Blind helps students learn the skills necessary to live independently, seek employment and be productive members of the community.

WFS offers educational and experiential learning through the Visions: Adventures in Learning Program and their Camp Bloomfield in Malibu. Weekend Visions trips to national treasures such as Yosemite, as well as summer camp sessions at Camp Bloomfield, provide children who are blind, visually impaired or multi-disabled with the chance to build confidence, develop habits toward healthier lifestyles and gain independence.

Wayfinder Paralympic Games 
Each year, WFS hosts a number of events for children and families. The organization's signature event, Wayfinder Paralympic Games (formerly known as the Junior Blind Olympics), invites boys and girls ages 6 to 19 to compete in Olympic-style events adapted for the blind. Athletes come from California, Utah, Arizona, Nevada and elsewhere to compete in such events as rowing, shot put, 100-yard dash, archery, rock wall climbing and the long jump, among others.

References

External links
 

Blindness organizations in the United States
Charities based in California
Non-profit organizations based in Los Angeles
Organizations established in 1953
1953 establishments in California